Vladas Sidoravicius (1963, Vilnius, Lithuania – 23 May 2019, Shanghai) was a Lithuanian-Brazilian mathematician, specializing in probability theory.

Education and career
At Vilnius University, Sidoravicius graduated in mathematics with Diplom in 1985 and Magister degree in 1986. At Lomonosov State University he matriculated in 1986 and received his doctoral degree in 1990 with thesis advisor Vadim Aleksandrovich Malyshev. At Heidelberg University and at Paris Dauphine University, Sidoravicius was a postdoc from 1991 to 1993. In the early 1990s he gained an international reputation for his research in probability theory. In 1993 he moved to Brazil. He became a naturalized Brazilian citizen and was a full professor at the Instituto de Matemática Pura e Aplicada (IMPA) in Rio de Janeiro from 1999 to 2015, when he moved to China. At New York University Shanghai (NYU Shanghai), he was a professor of mathematics and also served as the deputy director of NYU Shanghai's NYU-ECNU (East China Normal University) Institute of Mathematical Sciences from 2015 until his death in 2019 at age 55.

Sidoravicius was the author or co-author of over 100 articles in refereed journals. He was a frequent collaborator of Harry Kesten. Their 2008 article A Shape Theory for the Spread of an Infection is particularly noteworthy.

In 2014 Sidoravicius was an invited speaker at the International Congress of Mathematicians in Seoul. In 2019 the XXIII Escola Brasileira de Probabilidade (XXIII Brazilian School of Probability) was dedicated to his memory.

Selected publications

Articles

 2009

Books

References

External links

1963 births
2019 deaths
20th-century Lithuanian mathematicians
Probability theorists
Vilnius University alumni
Moscow State University alumni
Instituto Nacional de Matemática Pura e Aplicada researchers
Academic staff of the East China Normal University
21st-century Brazilian mathematicians